Paul Lindquist (born 25 October 1964 in Stockholm) is  a Swedish politician and commissioner of Stockholm County Council and former mayor of Lidingö. He is a Moderate Party member.

Paul Lindquist has a BSc in Business Administration from Uppsala University in Sweden. He has worked for IBM (1989-1993) and telecom gigant Ericsson (1993-2002) in various marketing and management positions before being appointed mayor and chairman of the municipal executive board in 2003. He served 3 consecutive terms before stepping down in November 2014 after being appointed county council commissioner, responsible for capital expenditure and real estate. Lindquist is married and has two children.

Lindquist is also chairman of Locum AB, owned by the Stockholm County Council and one of Sweden's larger property managers, as well as member of the European Union Committee of the Regions. Between 2007 and 2104 Lindquist was chairman of the Käppala Association, a local federation for sewage treatment from 11 municipalities in the greater Stockholm area, 2003-2007 member of the county labor board and 2007-2012 member of the county police board.

1964 births
Living people
Politicians from Stockholm
Uppsala University alumni
Moderate Party politicians
Municipal commissioners of Sweden
Swedish bloggers